Dioryctria amatella, the southern pineconeworm moth, is a species of moth of the family Pyralidae. It is found in the south-eastern United States, from Maryland south to Florida and west into Texas.

The wingspan is 27–32 mm. The forewings are dark gray to brown to nearly black and are boldly patterned with multiple contrasting white patches and zig-zag crossbands. The hindwings are light gray to tan. There are one to four generations per year, with adults on wing from early April to early November.

The larvae feed on Pinus species. They feed on the buds, male and female flowers, shoots, branches, stems and first- and second-year cones. The feeding causes large external masses of pitch. The species overwinters as an early instar larvae at the base of persistent cones, under bud scales or in fusiform galls on branches and stems.

Gallery

References

Moths described in 1887
amatella